Erika Lee Doss is an American educator and author, having served as a professor in the Department of American Studies at the University of Notre Dame.

Doss received her Ph.D. from the University of Minnesota in 1983, and "has held fellowships at the Stanford Humanities Center, Georgia O'Keeffe Museum Research Center, Smithsonian American Art Museum, Rockwell Center for American Visual Studies, and Crystal Bridges Museum of American Art".

In her 1999 book, Elvis Culture: Fans, Faith, and Image, Doss examines the enduring popularity of singer Elvis Presley, and his rule-breaking dynamics.

References

Year of birth missing (living people)
University of Notre Dame faculty
American studies scholars
University of Minnesota alumni
Living people